Mauro Sandreani (born 26 September 1954) is an Italian former professional football player and coach.

Playing career
Born in Rome, Sandreani spent three seasons in the Serie A with A.S. Roma, gaining 31 appearances and no goals. His playing career was cut short by serious injuries.

Coaching career
In his coaching career, Sandreani led Calcio Padova to promotion to Serie A in 1994, where they spent two seasons, and managed Empoli F.C. in the Serie A in the 1998–99 season, failing to avoid relegation.

Sandreani managed Segunda Division side CD Tenerife.

Outside football
Sandreani's voice is used for commentary in the Italian version of the Konami computer game Pro Evolution Soccer 2008.

Personal life
Mauro is the father of the football player Alessandro Sandreani.

References

1954 births
Living people
Italian footballers
Association football defenders
Serie A players
Serie B players
Serie C players
A.S. Roma players
L.R. Vicenza players
Genoa C.F.C. players
Modena F.C. players
Alma Juventus Fano 1906 players
Rimini F.C. 1912 players
Vis Pesaro dal 1898 players
Italian football managers
Calcio Padova managers
Torino F.C. managers
Ravenna F.C. managers
Empoli F.C. managers
CD Tenerife managers
Treviso F.B.C. 1993 managers